Amphion () and Zethus (Ζῆθος Zēthos) were, in ancient Greek mythology, the twin sons of Zeus (or Theobus) by Antiope. They are important characters in one of the two founding myths of the city of Thebes, because they constructed the city's walls. Zethus or Amphion had a daughter who was called Neis (Νηίς), the Neitian gate at Thebes was believed to have derived its name from her.

Mythology

Childhood
Amphion and Zethus were the sons of Antiope, who fled in shame to Sicyon after Zeus raped her, and married King Epopeus there. However, either Nycteus or Lycus attacked Sicyon in order to carry her back to Thebes and punish her.  On the way back, she gave birth to the twins and was forced to expose them on Mount Cithaeron.  Lycus gave her to his wife, Dirce, who treated her very cruelly for many years.

Antiope eventually escaped and found her sons living near Mount Cithaeron. After they were convinced that she was their mother, they killed Dirce by tying her to the horns of a bull, gathered an army, and conquered Thebes, becoming its joint rulers. They also either killed Lycus or forced him to give up his throne.

Rule of Thebes
Amphion became a great singer and musician after his lover Hermes taught him to play and gave him a golden lyre. Zethus became a hunter and herdsman, with a great interest in cattle breeding. As Zethus was associated with agriculture and the hunt, his attribute was the hunting dog, while Amphion’s - the lyre. Amphion and Zethus built fortifications of Thebes. They built the walls around the Cadmea, the citadel of Thebes at the command of Apollo. While Zethus struggled to carry his stones, Amphion played his lyre and his stones followed after him and gently glided into place.

Amphion married Niobe, the daughter of Tantalus, the Lydian king. Because of this, he learned to play his lyre in the Lydian mode and added three strings to it.  Zethus married Thebe, after whom the city of Thebes was named. Otherwise, the kingdom was named in honour of their supposed father Theobus.

Later misfortunes
Amphion's wife Niobe had many children, but had become arrogant and because of this she insulted the goddess Leto, who had only two children, Artemis and Apollo. Leto's children killed Niobe's children in retaliation (see Niobe). It’s Niobe’s overweening pride in her children, offending Apollo and Artemis, brought about her children’s deaths. In Ovid, Amphion commits suicide out of grief; according to Telesilla, Artemis and Apollo murder him along with his children. Hyginus, however, writes that in his madness he tried to attack the temple of Apollo, and was killed by the god's arrows.

Zethus had only one son, who died through a mistake of his mother Thebe, causing Zethus to kill himself.  In the Odyssey, however, Zethus's wife is called a daughter of Pandareus in book 19, who killed her son Itylos in a fit of madness and became a nightingale.

After the deaths of Amphion and Zethus, Laius returned to Thebes and became king.

Compare with Castor and Polydeuces (the Dioscuri) of Greece, and with Romulus and Remus of Rome.

Family tree

Gallery

Amphion

Amphion and Zethus

See also
Divine twins

Mention in Ancient Sources 
 Plato, Gorgias, 485e.

Notes

References 

 Apollodorus, The Library with an English Translation by Sir James George Frazer, F.B.A., F.R.S. in 2 Volumes, Cambridge, MA, Harvard University Press; London, William Heinemann Ltd. 1921. ISBN 0-674-99135-4. Online version at the Perseus Digital Library. Greek text available from the same website.
Homer, The Odyssey with an English Translation by A.T. Murray, PH.D. in two volumes. Cambridge, MA., Harvard University Press; London, William Heinemann, Ltd. 1919. . Online version at the Perseus Digital Library. Greek text available from the same website.
 Pausanias, Description of Greece with an English Translation by W.H.S. Jones, Litt.D., and H.A. Ormerod, M.A., in 4 Volumes. Cambridge, MA, Harvard University Press; London, William Heinemann Ltd. 1918. . Online version at the Perseus Digital Library
Pausanias, Graeciae Descriptio. 3 vols. Leipzig, Teubner. 1903.  Greek text available at the Perseus Digital Library.
Tzetzes, John, Book of Histories, Book I translated by Ana Untila from the original Greek of T. Kiessling's edition of 1826. Online version at theio.com

Further reading 
 

Theban kings
Kings in Greek mythology
Children of Zeus
Demigods in classical mythology
Theban characters in Greek mythology
Deeds of Apollo